Ernest Stapleton (15 January 1869 — 14 December 1938) was an English cricketer who played first-class cricket for Derbyshire in 1902.

Stapleton was born in New Basford, Nottinghamshire, the son of Ernest Stapleton, a hose trimmer, and his wife Sarah.

Stapleton made a cricketing appearance for the Nottinghamshire Colts against the Yorkshire Colts in 1896. He played in his first and only first-class match for Derbyshire in the 1902 season in a match in June against Marylebone Cricket Club. Stapleton, as an opening batsman, made just one run in the first innings and just two runs in the second. He was a right-handed batsman and played just that one match with a first-class run total of 3.

Stapleton made no further first-class appearances but in 1909 played one match for Glamorgan in the Minor Counties Championship. 
 
Stapleton died in Nottingham. His brothers-in-law, John and George Gunn played Test cricket for England, while his nephew, also named George Gunn played for Nottinghamshire for 22 years.

References

1869 births
1938 deaths
English cricketers
Derbyshire cricketers
Glamorgan cricketers